Agostino Ramelli (1531–ca. 1610) was an Italian engineer best known for writing and illustrating the book of engineering designs Le diverse et artificiose machine del Capitano Agostino Ramelli, which contains, among others, his design for the bookwheel. 

Ramelli was born in Ponte Tresa or Mesanzena, today in Switzerland.  During the Siege of La Rochelle (1572–1573), he successfully engineered a mine under a bastion and breached the fortification, making him popular with his commander, Henri d'Anjou, who later became King Henri III of France.  

In 1588 Ramelli published Le diverse et artificiose machine del Capitano Agostino Ramelli, or The various and ingenious machines of Captain Agostino Ramelli. The book contains 195 designs, over 100 of which are water-raising machines, such as water pumps or wells. Other designs include bridges, mills, and a possible forerunner to the Wankel engine. The bookwheel is one of the most famous designs from this book. Le diverse et artificiose machine is still printed and sold.

References

External links 
 
Complete high-resolution scan of a 1588 printing of Le diverse et artificiose machine del Capitano Agostino Ramelli (all pages freely available for download in variety of formats from Science History Institute Digital Collections at digital.sciencehistory.org).
Diverse et artificiose machine From the Rare Book and Special Collections Division at the Library of Congress
Schatzkammer mechanischer Künste, des Capitains Herrn Augustini de Ramellis. Leipzig Durch Henning Grossen den Jüngern, 1620. From the Rare Book and Special Collections Division at the Library of Congress
 Agostino Ramelli (1588) Le diverse et artificiose machine del Capitano Agostino Ramelli - digital facsimile from the Linda Hall Library

1531 births
1610 deaths

Italian engineers
Italian military engineers
People from Lugano District
People of the French Wars of Religion